The following is a list of characters that first appeared in the British soap opera EastEnders in 2020, by order of first appearance. All characters are introduced by the show's senior executive producer, Kate Oates, and the executive producer, Jon Sen. The first character to be introduced in 2020 is the son of Sheree Trueman (Suzette Llewellyn), Isaac Baptiste (Stevie Basaula). The Panesar family matriarch Suki Panesar (Balvinder Sopal) is then introduced in January. Laura Awoyinka (Sarah Paul), a colleague of Gray Atkins (Toby-Alexander Smith), is introduced in March. Frankie Lewis (Rose Ayling-Ellis), a deaf character who befriends Ben Mitchell (Max Bowden), is introduced in May. Ellie Nixon (Mica Paris) joins the soap in September. Two months later, Katy Lewis (Simone Lahbib), the mother of Frankie, first appears. One month later, Mila Marwa (Ruhtxjiaïh Bèllènéa) is introduced as a rival, then friend, for Kim Fox. Additionally, multiple other characters were featured during the year.

Isaac Baptiste 

Isaac Baptiste, played by Stevie Basaula, first appears in episode 6053/6054, originally broadcast on 1 January 2020. The character had not been announced prior to his first appearance and Basaula's casting details were announced following broadcast. Isaac is introduced as the son of established character Sheree Trueman (Suzette Llewellyn). The character is billed as a "fiercely confident" and "bold" teacher who "won't be afraid to leave his mark on the soap". Jon Sen, the show's executive producer, described Isaac as someone arriving with "bravado, charisma and his fair share of charm". Basaula expressed his excitement to join the soap and create the character of Isaac. It was confirmed in February 2022 that Basaula quit his role and he departed on 31 March 2022.

Since Sheree's introduction in August 2019, it was established that she had a secret, which was revealed to be Isaac in his first episode, an episode set on Christmas Day 2019. Sen dubbed Isaac "the 'other man' in Sheree's life". He added that Isaac has a "troubled past" which would be explored as the reason behind Sheree keeping Isaac a secret from her husband, Patrick Trueman (Rudolph Walker), becomes clear. Later episodes confirmed that Isaac is Patrick's biological son after Patrick realises the truth and questions Sheree. Isaac is first seen on New Year's Day 2020, on a bench in Albert Square.

Suki Panesar 

Suki Panesar (also Kaur), played by Balvinder Sopal, first appears in episode 6069, originally broadcast on 27 January 2020. The character was mentioned on-screen before her introduction, but further details about the character and Sopal's casting details were announced on 22 December 2019. Suki is introduced as the mother of Kheerat Panesar (Jaz Deol), Jags Panesar (Amar Adatia), Vinny Panesar (Shiv Jalota) and Ash Kaur (Gurlaine Kaur Garcha). The character is billed as the "fiercely protective" and "larger than life" matriarch of the established Panesar family who "always knows best" and is "not one to be reckoned with". Sopal expressed her delight at joining the soap and deemed the role "a dream come true". Jon Sen, the show's executive producer, commented that Sopal provides "a unique blend of steeliness and charm" to the role.

Following the introduction of her children in 2019, it is revealed that Suki is terminally ill and wants to reunite with Ash, who left the family following Suki's disapproval of her sexuality and abortion. Sen deemed it obvious that the Panesar children were "under the shadow of an overbearing matriarch", which leads to Suki's arrival. Sen later added that "she comes in and gives shape to that family. [...] She is powerful and ruthless, and yet you wouldn't think she'd say boo to a goose, so she's got this kind of fantastic Machiavellian narcissism in a way, and it's just wonderful to watch." The character's stories focus on her estranged relationship with Ash and multiple secrets that are revealed in the family. Huw Fullerton of the Radio Times predicted that Suki would "fit right in" to the soap.

For her portrayal of Suki, Sopal was longlisted for Best Villain at the 2020 Inside Soap Awards, and came second in the Digital Spy Reader Awards' Best Newcomer category.

Suki forms a friendship with Jean Slater (Gillian Wright) when the pair bond over their shared experiences with cancer, but it transpires that she is lying about her cancer in an attempt to gain her children's trust. Jean discovers the truth, and exposes Suki's lie to her children. Despite their initial disgust with what she has done, Suki persuades Kheerat, Jags and Vinny to forgive her, while Ash refuses to talk to her. During the COVID-19 lockdown, Suki purchases the local corner shop, the Minute Mart. When Vinny knocks Martin unconscious in the Minute Mart, she erases the CCTV footage, and tells the police that Jags attacked Martin, due to disapproving of his relationship with Habiba Ahmed (Rukku Nahar). She claims that Jags can handle prison better than Vinny. Secretly, Suki hands the police Jags' clothes, which have Martin's blood on, and he is sentenced to prison. Later, Suki has a one-night stand with Peter Beale (Dayle Hudson), despite knowing that there is an attraction between him and Ash. When Ash and Peter's relationship starts to get more serious, she is not pleased. After walking in on Ash and Peter, she tells her daughter that she could do better. As a result, Ash confronts Suki in The Queen Victoria public house, where she harshly insults her. Suki pretends to be unbothered by Ash's comments, but later leaves in tears.

Suki experiences money problems and asks Phil Mitchell (Steve McFadden) for a loan, offering to pay an additional 50% interest. She hides these issues from her family. The Panesars learn that Jags has been causing trouble in prison by goading other inmates, so they strike a deal with Ben Mitchell (Max Bowden) to pay him to protect Jags in prison. When Ben learns Kheerat is having a fling with Sharon Watts (Letitia Dean), he cancels the protection. Days later, Suki is informed that Jags has died in prison following a fatal beating.

Laura Awoyinka 

Laura Awoyinka, played by Sarah Paul, first appears in episode 6090, originally broadcast on 5 March 2020.

Laura is a partner at the law firm that Gray Atkins (Toby-Alexander Smith) works for. When Gray decides he wants to drop Kush Kazemi's (Davood Ghadami) grievous bodily harm charge and Whitney Dean's (Shona McGarty) murder charge due to stress, Laura encourages him to continue with the cases. She also asks Gray to persuade Kush to change his plea to guilty and reminds him that she has defended him to other partners at the firm before. Laura visits Gray at his home to congratulate him on the result of Kush's case and to wish him luck for Whitney's bail hearing. She tells him that Whitney needs to receive bail and warns him that Sophie Rundell (Suzanne Ahmet) will be the prosecution solicito at the hearing. Gray loses the bail hearing, so Laura visits him at his home to warn him that he will be formally suspended during the following week, devastating him. When the law firm drop Whitney's case, Gray decides to take it on. He meets with Laura at his home to inform her about the progress of it, asking for his job back if he wins the case. Laura reminds him that even if he wins, the law firm have to consider his judgement of Leo King (Tom Wells), the solicitor Gray employed at the firm while he was stalking Whitney. Laura later bumps into Gray and his family in the street, where she states that she is looking forward to their meeting with Whitney, who has gone missing. When she arrives for the meeting, she instead meets some of Whitney's friends and family, who offer to be character witnesses. However, Laura wants to see Whitney instead, so they claim that she is unwell. Laura and Gray later meet to discuss Whitney's trial; Laura wants to remove Gray from the case as his wife, Chantelle Atkins (Jessica Plummer), has recently died, but Gray wants to continue regardless. During the trial, Whitney's solicitor becomes ill, so Laura tries to persuade Judge Adams (Karlina Grace-Paseda) to postpone the closing statements to the following day; the judge refuses, so Laura informs Whitney and her aunt, Sonia Fowler (Natalie Cassidy), that they will need to get a solicitor from the firm to stand in; Whitney suggests that Gray do it. When Gray arrives, Laura and Sonia agree that Gray is not suitable for the job, but point out that they have to trust Whitney's decision. Following a not guilty verdict for Whitney, Laura congratulates Gray on his work and offers him his job back; he informs her that he is not returning to work, which surprises Laura. Laura later sees Gray with Whitney at a gala event, and, believing them to be a couple, expresses surprise that Gray has moved on so quickly after Chantelle's death. Gray lies that they are indeed a couple, insisting that love has no timetable. A few months after this, Gray attends a colleague's birthday party, now accompanied by Chelsea Fox (Zaraah Abrahams) when he encounters Laura again. After making the most of the free bar, Gray vents that he thinks Laura has a vendetta against him since she won't give him a promotion or any complex cases at work. When Chelsea takes a drunken Gray home, Laura comes round and warns Chelsea to get away from him while she can, as Gray will try to break her down and remodel her in his image as he did with Chantelle. Gray is later seen sending Laura a message on her Twitter account under the pseudonym Jasper, that says "People like you always get what's coming". She later sacks him. In December 2021, she later returns again and threatens Gray who is bad-mouthing her to her clients so they come to him instead. She later warns Whitney about his behaviour and tells her to get him away from Chelsea as quick as possible.

Viewers predicted that Laura would become Gray's fourth murder victim after Chantelle Atkins (Jessica Plummer), Tina Carter (Luisa Bradshaw-White) and Kush Kazemi (Davood Ghadami).

Frankie Lewis 

Frankie Carter (also Lewis), played by Rose Ayling-Ellis, first appears in episode 6115, originally broadcast on 18 May 2020. The character and Ayling-Ellis' casting details were announced on 23 February 2020. Frankie is introduced as a new friend for Ben Mitchell (Max Bowden), introduced to him by his boyfriend Callum Highway (Tony Clay) after Ben is diagnosed with hearing loss following a boat crash. The character, like Ayling-Ellis, is deaf and was created to raise awareness for deaf people in Britain. She is portrayed as a positive, upbeat person who "embraces the deaf community". Ayling-Ellis was contracted for a guest stint and Frankie appears in a "handful of episodes". The character and story were created by Charlie Swinbourne, a member of the soap's writing team, who pitched the story to his colleagues. Jon Sen, the show's executive producer, expressed his delight at working with Ayling-Ellis and exploring the deaf community in the new story. Ayling-Ellis expressed her excitement at joining the cast and being the first deaf actress on EastEnders. Bowden looked forward to portraying the story and called Ayling-Ellis "epic".

As a deaf person himself, Swinbourne was proud to create the soap's first regular deaf character. He added that he had wanted to see more representation of deafness in the media and looked forward to featuring "deaf characters and sign language" in Albert Square, the show's fictional setting. The use of sign language in scenes marks the first time it has featured in EastEnders. EastEnders worked with the National Deaf Children's Society (NDCS), disability charity Sense and other experts to portray Frankie and Ben's story accurately. Rosie Eggleston, the leader of the NDCS' work with young people, hoped that Frankie and Ben's story would help more young deaf people be visible and understood. She also liked working with the EastEnders research team when developing the story. Richard Kramer, the chief executive of Sense, agreed with Swinbourne that there was not enough disability representation in the media, so was pleased to learn EastEnders were featuring a story on hearing loss and introducing a new deaf character. He also congratulated Ayling-Ellis on becoming the first deaf actress to join the soap.

A behind-the-scenes video, released in August 2020, confirmed that Frankie would return following the show's three-month transmission break. Upon her return, the character becomes involved with the Carter family and accepts a job at The Prince Albert bar. Producers incorporated Frankie in an issue-led story with Mick Carter (Danny Dyer) after it emerges that she is Mick's daughter after he was abused, aged twelve, by Frankie's mother, Katy Lewis (Simone Lahbib), who was Mick's social worker during his time in care. EastEnders worked with charities, the NSPCC and SurvivorsUK, to accurately portray the story.

In August 2022, it was announced that Ayling-Ellis had quit her role as Frankie to seek other opportunities. She had already filmed her final scenes. Prior to her exit, writers used the character to explore the safety of women on the streets. Ayling-Ellis called the story "a really important one that will hit home for lots of people". The actress spoke proudly about her time on the soap and portraying its first deaf character. The show's executive producer, Chris Clenshaw, described Ayling-Ellis as "an incredible asset to EastEnders" and "a real trailblazer". Frankie's departure features in episode 6561, first broadcast on 22 September 2022, as she leaves for a job opportunity in Scotland. For this episode alone, she is credited as "Frankie Carter", reflecting one of her final scenes in which she tells Mick that she is changing her name.

Frankie is spotted by Callum Highway as she argues with Dr Laghari (Ezra Faroque Khan), her doctor. Callum later sees Frankie in Walford and asks her to talk to Ben about life as a deaf person; Ben initially rejects Frankie, but they soon form a friendship. Ben's mother, Kathy Beale (Gillian Taylforth), offers Frankie a trial shift as a bartender at her bar, The Prince Albert, unaware that the manager, Tina Carter (Luisa Bradshaw-White), has offered the job to her nephew, Mick Carter. Mick withdraws from the job, so that Frankie can have it, resulting in tension between Frankie and Tina. Despite this, they soon bond and Frankie meets Mick's son, Ollie Carter (Harry Farr), who has autism; she reveals that her dead brother Harry was autistic and looked similar to Ollie. Frankie takes photos of Mick, Ollie and Tina playing football, which Mick finds on her camera. Tina tries to kiss Frankie, but she rejects her. When Mick's wife, Linda Carter (Kellie Bright), struggles with childcare for Ollie, Frankie offers to take him to the park; when Mick discovers this, he rushes to collect Ollie and warns Frankie away from his family. Frankie then reveals that she believes that Mick is her father and explains that she discovered letters between Mick and her mother, Katy Lewis; Mick admits that he could be her father. Worried that this could cause Linda to relapse into alcoholism, Mick asks Frankie to not reveal the news. Frankie accuses Mick of repeatedly cheating on Linda, who he began a relationship with as a teenager, but Tina reveals that Katy was Mick's social worker when they were children, horrifying Frankie, who realises that Mick was twelve when she was conceived, prompting her to run off in disgust.

Frankie later engages in a feud with her half-sister, Nancy Carter (Maddy Hill), in 2021, after she returns from Australia. Frankie and Zack Hudson (James Farrar) accidentally run Nancy over with a car whilst on a driving lesson and cover it up. This culminates with them pranking each other and throwing insults and on Bonfire Night 2021, one prank goes wrong, with Nancy locking Frankie in the boot of her car and Liam Butcher (Alfie Deegan) stealing and driving off in it, with Frankie still in the boot.

Ellie Nixon 

Ellie Nixon, played by Mica Paris, first appears in episode 6136, originally broadcast on 25 September 2020. The character and Paris' casting details were announced on 20 August 2020, and she is introduced following the soap's three-month transmission break. Ellie is introduced as part of a story exploring Denise Fox's (Diane Parish) history. Jon Sen, the show's executive producer, was looking forward to the story and noted that it "really excites". The character is billed as "a wolf in sheep's clothing, with far more to her than her warmhearted façade lets on". Paris called Ellie a "hardcore" and "formidable" villain who could rival other villainous characters. The role marks the first time Paris has portrayed a villain.
Ellie will use "her prowess for playing roles in order to get what she wants". Sen dubbed the character "tough [and] no-nonsense" and "a ruthless and uncompromising force of nature". Paris expressed her delight at joining the cast, opining that it marked a "a new frontier" for her acting career. Appearing on BBC Radio 1Xtra, the actress stated that she and Ellie have very different personalities and upon seeing her early performances, she was "terrified". Sen explained that the role of Ellie required an actress with "both charisma and presence", so he decided to invite Paris for the role.

Upon the character's introduction, she is revealed to be the adoptive grandmother of Raymond Dawkins, the biological son of Denise and Phil Mitchell (Steve McFadden). Raymond's family, including Ellie's son, are killed in a car accident; Denise and Ellie meet at the hospital where Raymond is being treated, but Denise does not reveal her identity. To portray the scenes with "sentiment", Paris recalled her own experiences from the death of her brother, who was shot eighteen years previously. She also found that she became "swept up into the vortex of the story" due to its power. The actress added that Ellie is so "overwhelmed" in the aftermath of the accident, but realises that something is "not quite right with Denise". Despite this, she is thankful for Denise's presence as she is Ellie's main support. Paris noted that Ellie does not want "there to be anything bad with Denise".

Ellie did not have a close relationship with her family, but suddenly has to "step up" as Raymond's next of kin. Paris explained that Ellie has "been thrown in at the deep end", which shocks her. The character's introduction sparks a custody battle between Ellie and Denise. Paris told Alison Slade of What's on TV that both women want Raymond "for [their] own reasons", leaving Raymond "stuck in the middle". She added that her fierce personality also intimidates Phil. The actress enjoyed working with Parish and McFadden and opined that they "helped to make it that easy" as they are "great talent[s]". Ellie's guest stint concludes in episode 6153, originally broadcast on 26 October 2020. The character's exit was not announced prior to broadcast. In the narrative, Ellie is blackmailed by Phil into signing guardianship of Raymond to him, before leaving.

Katy Lewis 

Katy Lewis, played by Simone Lahbib, first appears in episode 6160, originally broadcast on 6 November 2020. Some character details and Lahbib's casting were announced on 22 September 2020, but most details, including the character's name, were not publicised until 3 November 2020. The character is introduced as the mother of Frankie Lewis (Rose Ayling-Ellis) and former social worker of Mick Carter (Danny Dyer), who she sexually abused when he was a child. Through Katy's introduction, producers explored the issue of historical sexual abuse. EastEnders worked with charities, the NSPCC and SurvivorsUK, to accurately portray the story. Lahbib expressed her excitement at joining the cast and teased that Katy would have "a lasting impact on the Carters and will test their strength as a family". She was also excited to work with her former Bad Girls co-stars Kellie Bright (Linda Carter), Luisa Bradshaw-White (Tina Carter) and Linda Henry (Shirley Carter). Jon Sen, the show's executive producer, said that Katy's story is "important" with an "impact on the Carters set to be everlasting".

When the character arrives in Walford, she is introduced as the mother of Frankie Lewis (Rose Ayling-Ellis) and it is revealed that she used to work in a children's home, where Mick Carter (Danny Dyer) was a resident. Frankie points out to Mick that he was sexually abused when at the home. When Mick starts having flashbacks, Katy convinces him that the events that happened are not how he remembers them. When Linda Carter (Kellie Bright) has an affair, she convinces him that the marriage is not worth saving. When Mick contemplates suicide, during a phone call to The Samaritans, he realises that she did abuse him and rape him when he was 12 years old. Katy stands trial after pleading guilty and in spite of Frankie's positive character statement, she is sentenced to ten years imprisonment and is placed on the sex offenders register indefinitely. Before she is taken down, she apologises to Mick.

In an interview with Digital Spy, Lahbib stated that it has been "very interesting and challenging" to play a character like Katy, due to having portrayed "strong but vulnerable" characters in her acting career. She stated that Katy is "much more complex, damaged and dark" than her previous roles, and noted that previous characters she has played have been "emotional and from the heart", while Katy is "all from the head", "clever and quick thinking", and that she "grooms people, gains trust, extracts information, then uses it to manipulate them." She added that at the beginning of Katy's tenure, she wanted "the audience to be sucked in by her in the beginning", and to be confused in the ways that Mick was. Lahbib also confirmed that prior to playing Katy, she did research including speaking to survivors of sexual abuse, watching documentaries and reading books. Lahbib explained that she "didn't want to let Katy's mask slip too soon", explaining that "some viewers weren't sure if Katy was good or bad at the start", which is what she hoped for. She went on to say: "I wanted viewers to be drawn in by the way Katy charms people, so it was great to see that coming across. People were saying they hate Katy and that she's gaslighting Mick, which shows they understood what she was doing." On scenes that were filmed in the COVID-19 pandemic, she explained that Dyer asked producers if they could become a "bubble" so that they did not have to film two metres apart, the advised amount of space to prevent spreading coronavirus. She described filming those scenes as "exciting", and noted that it would have been "hard to do while staying two metres apart".

Mila Marwa

Mila Marwa, played by Ruhtxjiaïh Bèllènéa, made her first appearance on 15 December 2020 when she is introduced as a woman who competes with Kim Fox (Tameka Empson) for a job at the Prince Albert club. After the pair argue and drop a bottle of alcohol, Mila explains the mistake, and Kathy Beale (Gillian Taylforth) hires her due to her honesty. Kim makes friends with Mila, and as part of her matchmaking scheme, she sets her up with Iqra Ahmed (Priya Davdra). The pair begin dating, and Kim asks them to be part of an interview for her matchmaking business. Mila uses a fake name and is outraged when a photographer takes her photo. Davdra stated that Iqra is confused by Mila's behaviour, since she "doesn't know what is going on" with her. She explained that Iqra initially blames herself, due to her failed relationship with Ash Kaur (Gurlaine Kaur Garcha). Mila explains to Iqra that she fell in love with a girl when she was 16 and told her mother, who was unaccepting of her sexuality. Her mother attempted to have her put into conversion therapy, so she ran away from home and changed her name from Robi to Mila. Once Mila opens up to Iqra about her past, Iqra "is able to see that the two actually share a lot of common ground". Since Iqra had recently came out to her family at the point of the scene's transmission, Davdra stated that it meant Iqra "definitely understands" Mila's situation, and can give her advice based on her own experience.

It was announced on 17 January 2022 that Bèllènéa had made the decision to leave the soap and her and Kioni's final scenes aired on 3 February 2022. Viewers expressed their anger at the sisters' final scenes on the soap, feeling that their exit was rushed by the soap and that their characters deserved more development. What to Watchs Grace Morris echoed the comments, writing that their final scenes were unimpressive and that they deserved a better ending for their arc.

Other characters

References 

2020
, EastEnders
EastEnders